A vesta case, or simply a ”vesta”, is a small box made to house wax, or "strike anywhere", matches. The first successful friction match appeared in 1826, and in 1832 William Newton patented the "wax vesta" in England. It consisted of a wax stem with embedded cotton threads and a tip of phosphorus. Newton named his matches after Vesta, the Roman goddess of fire and the hearth. Small containers to house these friction matches were introduced shortly afterwards (in the early 1830s), to guard against accidental combustion. In England these containers took their name from the term Newton used for his invention, and they became known as "vesta cases", "vesta boxes" or simply "vestas". In America the more prosaic yet more descriptive term "match safes" was chosen.

There are three main forms of vesta cases: pocket vestas, table or standing vestas and “go to bed” vestas. Pocket vesta cases were the most popular form, and were often made to be suspended from a fob chain or an Albert chain. Table vestas were usually larger than pocket vestas and left in a handy position in the home, such as the kitchen or close to a fireplace. “Go to bed” vestas were often joined to a candle stick holder or had a holder for a single match.

They were made throughout the world including the United Kingdom, in the U.S.A., continental Europe, Japan and Australia. Important and notable English makers of vesta cases included silversmiths such as Mappin & Webb, Sampson Mordan, Asprey & Co., William Neale & Sons, Elkington & Co., Saunders & Shepherd and William Hair Haseler, who partnered with Arthur Lasenby Liberty, the founder of Liberty. Significant American manufacturers of match safes include Wm. B. Kerr, Gorham, Unger Brothers, Battin, Blackington, Whiting, George Scheibler and Shreve & Co.

Designs

There are many different shapes and decorations. As well as plain and decorated square, oblong and round cases, many novelty shapes have been recorded; silver, brass or white metal pigs with hinged heads were popular, as were vesta cases in the form of Mr Punch, hearts, skulls, books, musical instruments (often violas), owls, boots and shoes, bottles, ladies' legs and so on. Sporting decorations were common, especially golf and cricket. As were hunting scenes and armorial decorations.

They were also made in a wide range of materials, including silver, brass, tin, gunmetal, nickel silver, gold, bone, ivory and early plastics such as tortoiseshell and bakelite. The more unusual materials included leather, wood, horn, ceramics (usually for table vestas) and the sea bean seed from Entada gigas commonly known as the monkey-ladder, sea bean, Cœur de la Mer or Sea Heart. Although many were made of inexpensive materials (most often brass or nickel silver), sterling silver was perhaps the common material, especially in England. Wealthier users often carried vestas made of precious metals, e.g. gold, or enameled versions.  More expensive vestas often had a gold wash interior to prevent corrosion by the chemically active match heads.

A distinguishing characteristic of vesta cases is that they have a ribbed surface, usually on the bottom, for lighting the matches.  Some vestas incorporated a cigar cutter or a small knife blade. Pocket vestas and sovereign cases were sometimes combined into the one item, as were vesta cases and stamp holders.

Decorations were often engraved into metal vestas (with floreate patterns the most common), though other techniques were sometimes used, including repoussé and chasing, guilloché, engine turning, cloisonné, cold-painting, enamelling and niello. Many vestas had cartouches in a central position on the front for the engraving of initials etc.

Promotional vestas were sometimes produced by different companies, for example, the Gillette company produced a brass razor blade case with a ribbed bottom that could be used as a vesta case after the razor blades had been used, and Veuve Cliquot produced a vesta in the shape of a champagne bottle. Some vestas were produced as mementos for tourists and others were produced to commemorate important events, such as the death of Queen Victoria.

Collecting

Vesta cases are highly collectable and can still to be found in a vast array of shapes, sizes and materials. Prices vary considerably depending on a broad range of factors, including the material of manufacture, maker, condition, age, design, rarity and subject matter. Because of their collectability and the prices that some forms can command, fakes and replicas can be found, sometimes even in reputable antique shops.

References

External links

 International Match Safe Association and Museum
 George Sparacio's article on Pocket Match Safe history
 Match Safe collection at Cooper-Hewitt, National Design Museum

Antiques
Matches (firelighting)